Clubiona moesta is a species of sac spider in the family Clubionidae. It is found in the United States, Canada, and China.

References

Clubionidae
Articles created by Qbugbot
Spiders described in 1896